Susana Romero Steensma (born 5 September 1990) is a Spanish former sailor, who specialized in the Laser Radial class. She represented her country Spain at the 2008 Summer Olympics and eventually earned a bronze medal at the 2009 Mediterranean Games in Pescara, Italy. Romero trained under the tutelage of her personal coach Santi López-Vázquez, while sailing competitively for Gran Canaria Royal Nautical Club.

Romero competed for the Spanish sailing squad, as a 17-year-old, in the inaugural Laser Radial class at the 2008 Summer Olympics in Beijing. She topped the national rankings by a 19-point edge ahead of Alicia Cebrián to lock the country's Laser Radial spot for the Games, based on her performance in three selection meets approved by the Royal Spanish Sailing Federation. Romero started comfortably with a stellar top-ten feat on the second mark, but she steadily faded her pace towards the middle of the fleet for the remainder of the series, sitting her in the twenty-first spot with a net grade of 127.

Notes

References

External links
 
 
 
 
 

1990 births
Living people
Spanish female sailors (sport)
Olympic sailors of Spain
Sailors at the 2008 Summer Olympics – Laser Radial
Mediterranean Games medalists in sailing
Mediterranean Games bronze medalists for Spain
Competitors at the 2009 Mediterranean Games
Sportspeople from Las Palmas